Załuski is a surname.

People with this surname
 Andrzej Chryzostom Załuski (1650 – 1711), Polish preacher, translator, prolific writer, Chancellor of the Crown and Bishop
 Andrzej Stanisław Kostka Załuski (1695 – 1758), priest (bishop) in the Polish-Lithuanian Commonwealth
 Józef Andrzej Załuski (1702 – 1774), Polish Catholic priest, Bishop of Kiev, and bibliophile
 Józef Bonawentura Załuski (1787 – 1866), Polish General Officer and diarist, and participant in the Napoleonic Wars of 1808–1814
 Louis Bartholomew Zaluski (1661 – 1721), Polish Cardinal of the Roman Catholic Church, Auxiliary Bishop of Przemysl, and Bishop of Płock
 Marcin Załuski (1700-1765), Roman Catholic Bishop of Plock and statesman in Poland
 Zbigniew Załuski (1926 – 1978), Polish army officer, writer and Member of Parliament

Surnames of Polish origin